Ruby Miller (born August 1992) is a Welsh racing cyclist from Llantwit Major.

She began competing as a triathlete at the age of 10 as her mother was a coach with the Maindy Triathlon club in Cardiff. Miller then began cycling with the Maindy Flyers youth cycling club and was spotted at a cyclo-cross event and selected to ride for the British Cycling's Wales talent team.

She raced in the Netherlands in 2007, representing Wales in the Interland track competition. Miller is currently sponsored and riding for Trek.

During the 2008-2009 Track Cycling season Ruby competed in the Revolution Future Stars Series at the Manchester Velodrome. She took a number of impressive race victories throughout the season and won the series overall in February 2009, defeating Laura Trott.

Miller competed for the Threads.com/DFT team in the team pursuit in the UCI Track Cycling World Cup Classics event at Manchester Velodrome in February 2011.

Miller participated as a torchbearer for the 2012 Summer Olympics torch relay.

She is currently studying occupational therapy at Cardiff University.

Palmarès

2007
1st National Trophy cyclo-cross series – Youth
4th Round 1, Abergavenny
2nd Round 2, Ipswich
1st Round 3, Mallory Park
1st Round 4, Bradford
1st Round 5, Derby
1st Welsh Youth Duathlon Championships

2008
1st  British National Cyclo-cross Championships – Youth
1st  XC, British National Mountain Bike Championships – Youth
2nd Pursuit, British National Track Championships – Under 16
2nd Points race, British National Track Championships – Under 16
2nd Scratch race, British National Track Championships – Under 16
3rd 500m TT, British National Track Championships – Under 16
4th Points race, British National Track Championships – Senior
1st Welsh Youth Duathlon Championships
3rd British Youth Duathlon Championships

2009
1st Scratch race, British National Track Championships – Junior
1st Revolution Track Cycling Future Stars Series – Under 16
1st National Mountain Biking championships – Junior

2010
1st National Trophy Series, Round 2 – Ipswich
1st Welsh Cyclocross League, Round 3 – Getting Cross at Ty Mawr, Penperlleni
2nd Welsh Cyclocross Championships
3rd Cyclo-Cross National Trophy, Round 6 – Rutland
4th Points race, British National Track Championships
4th Scratch race, British National Track Championships
4th 50 km, Big Welsh Weekend Enduro
5th British National Madison Championships (with Corrine Hall)
5th Points race, British National Track Championships – Junior
5th Cyclo-Cross National Trophy, Round 5 – Bradford
2011
1st Two Days of Bedford, Stage 1 (TTT)
1st Welsh Cyclocross League, Final – Christmas Cross, Cardiff
1st BUCS Cyclo Cross Championships
2nd Welsh Cyclocross League, Round 9 – Black Mountains Cross, Talgarth
2nd JIF Summer Crit
2nd BUCS Individual Pursuit
2nd BUCS 500m time trial
3rd Tywyn Criterium
3rd BUCS Mountain Biking Cross Country Championships
5th British National Mountain Bike Cross Country Championships Under 23

2012
1st Welsh Cyclocross League, Round 3 – Clerkenhill Cross, Clerkenhill Farm, Haverfordwest
1st Welsh Cyclocross League, Round 5 – Merlin's Knight Cross, Carmarthen Park
2nd BUCS Mountain Biking Cross Country Championships
3rd Southern XC Series, Round 3, Frith Hill
2013
2nd Welsh Mountain Bike Series, Round 2 –  Coed-y-Brenin Forest Park
4th British Cross Country National Championships Under 23

2014
2nd Welsh Mountain Bike Cross Country Championships
4th Southern XC Series, Round 5 – Queen Elizabeth Country Park
4th Welsh Mountain Bike XC Series, Round 1
5th Welsh Mountain Bike XC Series, Round 2

2015
1st Welsh National Criterium Championships

References

1992 births
Living people
Welsh female cyclists
Welsh female triathletes
Sportspeople from the Vale of Glamorgan